Reangzaeng is a village in Bishnupur district of Manipur state of India.

References

Villages in Bishnupur district